George Thomas Moore (1871–1956) was a U.S. botanist, who specialised in phycology, the study of algae. Moore was the director of the Missouri Botanical Garden in St. Louis, Missouri from 1912 to 1953.

Moore was born on February 23, 1871, in Indianapolis, Indiana. He obtained both a Bachelor of Science in 1894 from Wabash College in his home state, and a Bachelor of Arts in 1895 from Harvard University, continuing at the latter to obtain a Master of Arts in 1896 and finally, in 1900, a Doctor of Philosophy. Moore headed to the Missouri Botanical Garden after serving for two years as the head of the Botany Department at Dartmouth College, and for some time as head of the Laboratory of Plant Pathology at the United States Department of Agriculture. He was also the head of Marine Biological Laboratory in Woods Hole, Massachusetts. He also served on the board of trustees for Science Service, now known as Society for Science & the Public, from 1921 to 1923.

References

External links

1871 births
1956 deaths
American botanists
American phycologists
Botanists with author abbreviations
Missouri Botanical Garden directors
American nonprofit executives
Harvard University alumni